Oleh Stepanovych Barna (born 18 April 1967) is a Ukrainian human rights activist and politician who served as a People's Deputy of Ukraine in the Deputy of Ukraine of the 8th convocation.

Brother of Stepan Barna.

Sources 
 Барна Олег Степанович // Слово і Діло
 Барна Олег Степанович // LB.ua

Living people
1967 births
Ukrainian politicians
People of the Revolution on Granite